The 1990 Asian Basketball Confederation Championship for Women were held in Singapore. The championship is divided into two levels: Level I and Level II.

Level I

Level II

Final standing

Awards

References 
Results
FIBA Archive

1990
1990 in women's basketball
women
International women's basketball competitions hosted by Singapore
B